Alltid på väg (Always on the road) is the third studio album by Swedish singer/songwriter Nanne Grönvall, released in October 2005.

Track listing

References 

2005 albums
Nanne Grönvall albums